John Williams was a missionary ship under the command of Captain Robert Clark Morgan (1798–1864) and owned by the London Missionary Society (LMS). She was named after John Williams (1796–1839), a missionary who had been active in the South Pacific.

Se was paid for by the contribution of English school children.

She sank in 50 fathoms after drifting onto a reef at Danger Island (Pukapuka) on 16 May 1864. The passengers and crew were rescued.

Six more John Williams ships successively operated in the Pacific as part of the LMS's missionary work, the last, John Williams VII, being built in 1962 and decommissioned in 1968.

General specifications
John Williams was launched at Harwich on 20 March 1844. She had 10 state rooms. A medal was issued commemorating her first three-year voyage and an example of this is held at the Royal Museum of Greenwich.

References

Further reading
 Prout, Ebenezer (1865). Missionary ships connected with the London missionary society

Victorian-era ships of the United Kingdom
Shipwrecks in the Pacific Ocean
Ships built in Harwich
1844 ships
Maritime incidents in May 1864
Missionary ships
Shipwrecks of the Cook Islands